Ali Latifiyan (born December 6, 1968 – Tehran) (in Persian: علی لطیفیان), is an Iranian writer, researcher, social-political theorist, historian. Most of his theories and researches are in the field of enlightenment, intellectualism, liberalism and Iranian culture.

Biography 
Ali Latifiyan was born on December 15, 1968, in Tehran, Iran. His father, Mohammad Hossein Latifiyan, was an employee of Tehran University. This caused him to attend the meetings of great professors of the University of Tehran as a child. His father's grandfather, Heydar Latifiyan, was one of the commanders during World War I (Middle Eastern theatre) in the Persian campaign. He received his diploma in the field of natural sciences from Fatemi High School (one of the best high schools in Tehran in the 1980s). However, due to his interest in political science, he continued his higher studies in this field. He was able to receive his master's degree in two subjects: political science and Islamic studies. After that, he started teaching history, sociology, etc..in Iranian colleges and schools

He has published numerous papers and articles. A collection of those works is brought together in a collection called (Naghashi-Koodaki). Most of his works are short and beautiful stories about the history of Iran.

His book, titled "Reviewing the Performance of Intellectuals from 1941 to 1979", investigates such intellectuals as Jalal Al-Ahmad, Abdolkarim Soroush, Ali Shariati, Sadeq Hedayat, Mirzadeh Eshghi, Ahmad Shamlou and... during the time of Mohammad Reza Pahlavi (especially during Prime Minister Dr. Mohammad Mosaddegh events) pays. This book has been praised and encouraged by Abdolreza Hoshang Mahdavi, Hoshang Moqtader and Abdul Ali Bigdeli (some of the greatest Iranian political scientists).

One of the people who influenced him was his teacher during his studies, Davoud Hermidas-Bavand, who is one of the leaders of National Front of Iran.

He married Poopak NikTalab (daughter of Ahmad NikTalab) in 1999.

References 

Iranian political scientists
People from Tehran
Living people
Iranian democracy activists
Iranian nationalism
Iranian men
Democracy activists
Human rights activists
Iranian human rights activists
1968 births
Iranian activists
Iranian writers
Iranian male writers
Writers from Tehran
20th-century Iranian writers
21st-century Iranian writers
Iranian philosophers
Iranian political philosophers
21st-century Iranian philosophers
20th-century Iranian philosophers
Iranian essayists
Iranian political people
Male essayists
21st-century essayists
20th-century essayists
20th-century Iranian men
20th-century Iranian people
21st-century Iranian people
21st-century Iranian men